Izatha haumu (Māori name pepepepe haumu o Ngāti Kuri) is a species of moth in the family Oecophoridae. It is endemic to New Zealand. This species is classified as "At Risk, Naturally Uncommon" by the Department of Conservation. It is believed to only inhabit the Aupouri Peninsula.

Taxonomy and etymology 
This species was described by Robert J. B. Hoare in 2010 and named Izatha haumu. The Māori word haumu means "hairy" and refers to the grizzled appearance of the moth. The holotype specimen is held at the New Zealand Arthropod Collection.

Description 
The wingspan is 18–22 mm for males and about 23 mm for females. This species is very similar in appearance to I. mesoschista and it is likely the two species can only be distinguished by an examination of male genitalia.

Distribution
It is endemic to New Zealand, where it is known from the Aupouri Peninsula of Northland. I. haumu is believed to be endemic to Aupouri Peninsula.

Biology and behaviour
Very little is known of the biology of this species but  adults have been recorded on the wing in October and November. The larvae of I. haumu has yet to be located.

Conservation Status 
This species has been classified as having the "At Risk, Naturally Uncommon" conservation status under the New Zealand Threat Classification System.

References

Oecophorinae
Moths described in 2010
Moths of New Zealand
Endemic fauna of New Zealand
Endangered biota of New Zealand
Endemic moths of New Zealand